Dharmalingam may refer to

 Anbil P. Dharmalingam (active from 1962), Indian politician
 Anbil Dharmalingam Agricultural College and Research Institute in Navalurkottapattu near Tiruchirappalli
 K. Dharmalingam (active from 1991), Indian politician
 P. K. Dharmalingam (1959–2019), Indian cricketer
 Rudi Dharmalingam (born 1981), British actor
 V. Dharmalingam (1918–1985), Sri Lankan politician
 Nagaenthran K. Dharmalingam, Malaysian drug trafficker sentenced to death in Singapore

Tamil masculine given names